The 1968 Nebraska Cornhuskers football team represented the University of Nebraska in the 1968 NCAA University Division football season. The team was coached by Bob Devaney and played their home games in Memorial Stadium in Lincoln.

The Huskers were 6–4, but had a losing record in conference at 3–4. They lost three Big 8 games at home and were shut out 47–0 at Oklahoma in the season finale.  Nebraska did not play in a bowl game for the second consecutive year; the next season without a bowl was 36 years later in 2004.  The home shut out against Kansas State was the last time they have been shut out at home as of 2017 season.

Following 1968, Tom Osborne was promoted to offensive coordinator and installed the I formation offense. This led to a 9–2 record in 1969 and consecutive undefeated national championship seasons in 1970 and 1971.

Schedule

Roster

Depth chart

Coaching staff

Game summaries

Wyoming

At the end of the 1st quarter, Nebraska was trailing 3-10, and struggled to catch up for much of the game.  Finally, five minutes into the 4th quarter, with the assistance of the Blackshirts who had held off any further scores from the Cowboys, the Cornhuskers managed to get another touchdown to tie the game. Then, as time was running out and the Nebraska offensive effort was stalling, Nebraska PK Paul Rogers launched a 51-yard field goal through the uprights and into the stands for the win, leading to an exuberant mob of fans rushing the field in celebration.

Utah

The Cornhuskers tallied 518 yards of total offense while holding the Utes to just 138, 46 of which were on the ground, and had little trouble with Utah, holding them scoreless in Memorial Stadium.

Minnesota

It seemed like a repeat of the first game of the year, as once again Nebraska started out behind and wasn't able to catch up again until the 4th quarter, and once again Nebraska PK Paul Rogers booted the game-winning field goal at the end of the 4th quarter with just 1:32 remaining on the clock to secure the win against national co-champion Minnesota.

Kansas

The highly regarded Kansas Jayhawks had been averaging 51 points per game, yet the Blackshirts managed to bottle them up to just 23 points, though Nebraska's 13 points were not enough to get the conference-opening win.  Kansas managed to escape Lincoln with a victory only by scrambling to put up two touchdowns in the final 4 minutes. This was the last time Nebraska lost to the Jayhawks until the 2005 season; they won the next 36 meetings. It also is, through the 2022 season, their last home loss to Kansas to date.

Missouri

Nebraska was severely hampered by a day of mistakes, losing four fumbles, an interception, and suffering two punt receptions muffed and recovered by Missouri.  Despite the tall odds presented by these burdens, the Cornhuskers dropped the game to the Tigers by only 2 points.

Oklahoma State

The first half was scoreless as both teams struggled unsuccessfully for an edge, but Oklahoma State found a way through and scored the first 14 in the 3rd.  Nebraska fought back, and once again Cornhusker PK Paul Rogers scored the game-winner off his foot with PAT in the final minute to put Nebraska ahead by 1.

Iowa State

Iowa State helped to spot Nebraska with an early 14-0 lead by losing an early fumble and never recovered from the setback.  The Cyclones made a feeble late attempt, coming within 8 points before the Cornhuskers put up another field goal to finish them off.

Kansas State

Nebraska was stunned at home, at their homecoming game, when Kansas State held the Cornhuskers to just 146 total yards, 78 on the ground, and slapped Nebraska with only their second shutout under Head Coach Bob Devaney. This was the Cornhuskers last loss to the Wildcats until 1998 and their last home loss to them until 2003.

Colorado

Nebraska flashed with some vengeance in response to the previous week's shutout, running out ahead of Colorado in Boulder 22-0 with help from a 62-yard punt return touchdown, finally letting the Buffaloes on the board with just 2 minutes remaining to play.

Oklahoma

Oklahoma denied Nebraska's bid for a post-season bowl game, as the Sooners scored five touchdowns to set a new Big 8 record and handed NU  its worst defeat of the Devaney era with a painful 47-0 shutout in Norman.

Rankings

Awards

1968 Team Players in the NFL (& AFL)

The 1968 Nebraska Cornhuskers seniors selected in the 1969 Common Draft (NFL-AFL):

The 1968 Nebraska Cornhuskers juniors selected in the following year's 1970 NFL Draft:

The 1968 Nebraska Cornhuskers sophomores selected in the 1971 NFL Draft:

Members of the 1968 Nebraska freshman team selected in the 1972 NFL Draft:

NFL and Pro Players
The following 1968 Nebraska players joined a professional team as draftees or free agents.

References

Nebraska
Nebraska Cornhuskers football seasons
Nebraska Cornhuskers football